São Donato Biological Reserve is a wetlands biological reserve established by the state of Rio Grande do Sul, Brazil.

History

The biological reserve was created by decree in 1975 to support conservation of ecosystems, scientific research and environmental education.
The reserve includes parts of the municipalities of Itaqui and Maçambara.
It covers part of one of the last wetland areas of Rio Grande do Sul and is important for several endangered species. 
There was an ongoing struggle to make the reserve a reality.
Implementation only began in 2001.
The headquarters of the reserve were inaugurated in May 2002.
In December 2003 the State Department of the Environment presented an environmental assessment and proposed limits for the reserve at a public hearing.

Environment

It takes up about 60% of the area of wetlands, with the remainder used for rice fields and flooded pastures.
The wetlands hold a mosaic of tall, dense herbaceous plant communities, in which sedge Scirpus giganteus predominates, along with other marsh plants such as Cyperus giganteus (Cyperaceae), Thalia geniculata (Marantaceae), Panicum grumosum and Panicum prionitis (Poaceae).

The area is used for breeding by many aquatic birds, particularly maguari stork (Ciconia maguari) and snail kite (Rostrhamus sociabilis).
Important bird species observed in the reserve include 
greater rhea (Rhea americana), sulphur-bearded reedhaunter (Limnoctites sulphuriferus), marsh seedeater (Sporophila palustris and Sporophila zelichi) and chestnut seedeater (Sporophila cinnamomea).

Notes

Sources

Biological reserves of Brazil
Protected areas of Rio Grande do Sul
Protected areas established in 1975
1975 establishments in Brazil